This is a list of spacewalks conducted from the Salyut space stations. Salyut was a Soviet programme which consisted of a number of early space stations, including the first space station to be launched, Salyut 1. Six of the space stations launched as part of the Salyut programme were crewed, and spacewalks were made from two of these, Salyut 6 and Salyut 7. A total of sixteen spacewalks were made in the Salyut programme; three from Salyut 6 and thirteen from Salyut 7. Each involved two cosmonauts. Fifteen different cosmonauts performed the spacewalks, with several performing multiple EVAs. Leonid Kizim and Vladimir Solovyov each performed eight EVAs, the most of any cosmonauts in the programme.

All of the EVAs were conducted by cosmonauts who part of an Expedition crew, with the exception of one spacewalk by Visiting Expedition 4 cosmonauts Svetlana Savitskaya and Vladimir Dzhanibekov, on which Savitskaya became the first woman to perform an EVA. This is highlighted in light blue.

See also 
 Extra-vehicular activity
 List of spacewalks and moonwalks
 List of cumulative spacewalk records
 Salyut programme
 List of human spaceflights to Salyut space stations
 List of Salyut expeditions
 List of Salyut visitors
 List of uncrewed spaceflights to Salyut space stations
 List of Mir spacewalks
 List of International Space Station spacewalks

References 

Salyut program
Salyut spacewalks
Human spaceflight